Jairo Velasco Jr. (born 21 January 1974) is a former Spanish professional tennis player. His father, Jairo Velasco Sr., was a Colombian tennis player, who emigrated to Spain.

Career
Velasco was a doubles specialist, usually teaming up with countryman Juan Ignacio Carrasco. The pair appeared together in the main draw of six Grand Slams, but only once made it past the opening round. That was at the 2000 French Open, where they upset ninth seeds Mahesh Bhupathi and David Prinosil to make the third round. The pair had previously played four Grand Slam matches together without a win, although they did have the misfortune of drawing Bhupathi/Paes at the French Open and The Woodies at Wimbledon for their first two Grand Slam appearances together in 1999. They had their best ATP Tour performance at Marseille, in 2000, when they finished runners-up. The Spaniards also reached semi-finals in the 1999 Majorca Open and 2000 Colombia Open.

Before teaming up with Carrasco in 1998, Velasco made the semi-finals of the Campionati Internazionali di San Marino, with Joan Balcells, in 1996. He also played Grand Slam tennis with Virginia Ruano Pascual at the 2000 Wimbledon Championships and Mariano Hood in the 2001 Australian Open.

He played World Team Cup tennis for Spain in 1999 and 2000.

ATP career finals

Doubles: 1 (0–1)

Challenger titles

Doubles: (8)

References

External links
 
 

1974 births
Living people
Spanish male tennis players
Tennis players from Barcelona
Spanish people of Colombian descent
Tennis players from Catalonia